FC Chkherimela (Georgian: სკ ჩხერიმელა) is a defunct Georgian football club based in the town of Kharagauli.

History
Founded in 1982, the club participated in low leagues of Georgian championship until 1997. Twelve years later the team resumed their activities as Chkherimela 2009 and took part in the third division. They gained promotion to Pirveli Liga where retained their place up until 2016. Having been accused of involvement in a match-fixing scandal, Chkherimela were deducted six points, fined and expelled from the competition.

The team played in Liga 3 for one year before being relegated to Regionuli Liga.
 
In 2018 the club was subjected to reorganization and reduction of financial assistance by five times compared to previous three years. Based on complaints from two former coaches, the next year the District court in Kutaisi and the Supreme Court ruled that Chkherimela owed them around 20 thousand lari.

In 2018 a Georgian record-breaking event occurred during a Regionuli Liga game held in Kharagauli. 65 year-old Soso Abashidze, a long-time Chkherimela player, scored a goal against Mertskali.

In February 2021 Chkherimela officially ceased to exist.

Stadium
In 2004 the stadium in Kharagauli was named after brothers Murtaz and Soso Abashidze, the two local football players who established the club in 1982. Lately it has become a home ground for Margveti 2006.

Current squad

References

External links 
 Chkherimela FC at soccerway
 Page on Facebook 

Association football clubs established in 1982
Football clubs in Georgia (country)
1982 establishments in Georgia (country)
Defunct football clubs in Georgia (country)